

Dinosaurs
 The French naturalist Abbé Dicquemare discovers and briefly describes (without illustrating) large bones discovered in the Normandy Coast's Vaches Noires Cliffs. Paleontologist Philippe Taquet has suggested that these bones were probably dinosaurian.

References

18th century in paleontology
Paleontology